The Blue Iguana is a 1988 American crime film directed by John Lafia and starring Dylan McDermott, Jessica Harper, Pamela Gidley and James Russo. The plot is about a bounty hunter who is blackmailed into stopping the transfer of twenty million dollars from a Mexican tax paradise into the United States. The film was screened out of competition at the 1988 Cannes Film Festival.

Plot
IRS agents send a private eye (Dylan McDermott) to Mexico to recover money laundered by a banker (Jessica Harper) and her sidekick (James Russo).

Cast
 Dylan McDermott as Vince Holloway
 Jessica Harper as Cora
 James Russo as Reno
 Pamela Gidley as Dakota
 Yano Anaya as Yano
 Flea as Floyd
 Michele Seipp as Zoe 'The Bartender'
 Tovah Feldshuh as Detective Vera Quinn
 Dean Stockwell as Detective Carl Strick
 Katia Schkolnik as Mona
 John Durbin as Louie Sparks
 Eliett as Veronica
 Don Pedro Colley as Boat Captain
 Pedro Altamirano as Rubberhead
 Benny Corral as Roy

Reception
Roger Ebert gave The Blue Iguana a negative review and described it as "a smart-aleck parody of private-eye movies, but it knows as little about private eyes as it does about parodies, and movies".

References

External links
 
 
 

1988 films
1980s crime comedy-drama films
1980s crime thriller films
American heist films
Films directed by John Lafia
Films produced by Steve Golin
Films set in Mexico
American crime comedy-drama films
Paramount Pictures films
PolyGram Filmed Entertainment films
1988 directorial debut films
1980s heist films
1980s English-language films
1980s American films